United States gubernatorial elections were held on November 8, 2005, in the states of New Jersey and Virginia as well as in the U.S. commonwealth of the Northern Mariana Islands.

This was the first election since 1987 that no seats switched parties in a gubernatorial election and the first election since 1991 where no net gains were made either.

National effect
Shortly before election day, U.S. President George W. Bush returned from a trip to Latin America to provide last-minute campaigning for Virginian gubernatorial candidate Jerry W. Kilgore. After the defeat of Kilgore and Doug Forrester in New Jersey, Democrats ascribed these victories to the President's decreasing popularity. Republicans then tried to downplay these Democratic triumphs as victories exclusive to those states and their candidates. Some speculate that these two elections were harbingers of the positive momentum around the Democratic Party, and it could be said that they had some positive effect on the landmark victories in the 2006 midterm elections and the 2008 presidential election for the party. Republicans, however, maintain that the Democrats' advantage in 2005 was due simply to the fact that they were the incumbent party.

Race summary

States

Territory

Closest races
States where the margin of victory was under 1%:
 Northern Mariana Islands, 0.6%

States where the margin of victory was under 10%:
 Virginia, 5.7%

Notes

External links
 Official NJ general election results

See also